Tetramerocerata is an order of pauropods containing 12 different families and about 480 different species. Tetrameroceratans have a 12 segmented body, 4 segmented antennae, 6 tergites, and 8 to10 legs pairs of legs as adults. Most pauropods in this order have 9 leg pairs as adults, but four genera (Cauvetauropus, Aletopauropus, Zygopauropus, and Amphipauropus) have only 8 pairs, and adult females in the genus Decapauropus (in the Pauropodidae family) have either nine or ten pairs of legs. Pauropods in this order are generally 0.5 mm to 2 mm long, and are usually white or brown. Tetramerocerata has a subcosmopolitan distribution, occurring nearly worldwide.

References

External links

Myriapod orders